Patrick Cazal (born 1971) is a French team handball player. He competed at the 2000 Summer Olympics, where the French team placed 6th. Since retiring from competitions in 2008 he worked as a handball coach, with Dunkerque Handball Grand Littoral (2011–2022).

Individual awards
 French Championship Best Coach: 2013, 2014

References

External links

1971 births
Living people
French male handball players
Olympic handball players of France
Handball players at the 2000 Summer Olympics
Sportspeople from Réunion